HMS Daring was a 4-gun  sloop of the Royal Navy.  She was launched in 1874 and sold for breaking in 1889 after serving most of her career in the Pacific.

Construction
Daring was constructed of an iron frame sheathed with teak and copper (hence 'composite'), and powered by a trunk engine provided by John Penn & Sons.  She was fitted with a full barque rig of sails.

History
Daring served on the Pacific and China Stations, working some of the time for the Canadian Government, including conducting hydrography, for which the Canadian Government bore half the cost. In Spring 18?? she carried Joseph Howe (the Provincial Secretary at the time) to the mouth of the Tangier River in Halifax County, Nova Scotia.  There he arranged to have law and order restored by carving the gold diggings into appropriately sized lots, and offering them for rental for $40.  In 1877 Commander John Hammer made a sketch survey of the Skeena River entrance from Daring.

Fate
She was sold to a Mr J Cohen in 1889 and broken up.

Notes

Bibliography

 

Fantome-class sloops
Ships built by the Blackwall Yard
1874 ships
Victorian-era sloops of the United Kingdom
Survey vessels of the Royal Navy
Military history of Nova Scotia